Valentino Argento (1901 – 8 September 1941) was an Italian fencer. He competed in the team foil competition at the 1924 Summer Olympics.

References

External links
 

1901 births
1941 deaths
Fencers from Naples
Italian male fencers
Olympic fencers of Italy
Fencers at the 1924 Summer Olympics